Kramgoa låtar 2002 is a studio album by Vikingarna, released in 2002. The song "En vän som du" charted at Svensktoppen, and the album became the band's first to top the Swedish albums chart since Kramgoa låtar 3 in 1976.

Track listing
En vän som du
Visst är det kärlek
Vägen hem
En sommar i Provence
Vi ska vandra tillsammans
Våren 1972
Har du en vän
Om du bara vill
Älskling
Kiss me Quick
Hjälp mig ur min ensamhet
Små ord av kärlek
Nu eller aldrig
Genom alla år
Du bara du

Charts

Weekly charts

Year-end charts

References

2002 albums
Vikingarna (band) albums
Swedish-language albums